= Satellite of Earth =

Satellite of Earth may refer to:

- Moon, the natural satellite of Earth
- Artificial satellites orbiting the Earth
